Syed Jafar Shah (born; 10 March 1957) is a Pakistani politician hailing from Swat District, belong to Awami National Party. Who is currently serving as Member of the Khyber Pakhtunkhwa Assembly. He is also serving as committee chairman and member of the different committees.

Political career
Syed Jafar Shah was elected twice as a member of the Khyber Pakhtunkhwa Assembly on the ticket of the Awami National Party from "PF-85 (Swat-VI) & PK-85 (Swat-VI) in Pakistan GE 2008 & 2013 Pakistani general election.

References

1957 births
Living people
Pashtun people
Khyber Pakhtunkhwa MPAs 2013–2018
People from Swat District
Awami National Party politicians